Vesldalstinden is a mountain in Skjåk Municipality in Innlandet county, Norway. The mountain is surrounded by several other notable mountains including Gjelhøi to the north, Holåtindan to the northwest, Merrahøi to the southwest, Steindalshøi and Svartdalshøi to the southeast, and Låven and Hestbrepiggene to the east.

See also
List of mountains of Norway

References

Skjåk
Mountains of Innlandet